Zelg Galešić (born 16 February 1979) is a Croatian mixed martial artist. A professional competitor who began his career in 2004, he fought for Bellator MMA, Cage Rage, PRIDE, DREAM, UCMMA, the SFL, and K-1 Hero's. He is the former Cage Rage British Middleweight Champion.

Background

Galešić began Tae Kwon Do when he was 10 years old and is a master of the sport, being a three-time ITF European Champion, two-time ITF World Champion, and two-time ITC Full Contact World Champion. He was undefeated in amateur rules in the UK at the Combat Sports Open Trials, where all but one of his fights were won in under a minute.

Mixed martial arts career

Early career
His first professional MMA bout was on 12 September 2004 at Ultimate Combat 11: Wrath of the Beast, where he won against Jim Bentley when the referee stopped the fight after 16 seconds.

On 30 August 2007, while Cage Rage British Middleweight Champion, he was made an offer to fight for K-1 Hero's, which he accepted. He lost his only fight with them, against Yoon Dong-sik.

DREAM
His first fights with DREAM, in 2008, were victories against Magomed Sultanakhmedov then Taiei Kin. However, in Galešić's most recent fights he has lost to Ronaldo Souza and Kazushi Sakuraba.

Having lost to former PRIDE veteran Kazushi Sakuraba, Galešić took 15 months off. He returned to fight on Liverpool's OMMAC promotion, where he took on a local fighter, Lee Chadwick. Galešić won the fight with a knockout in the first round.

Bellator
Galešić competed in the eight man Bellator Season 5 Middleweight Tournament. In the quarter-finals at Bellator 50 he lost to Alexander Shlemenko by guillotine choke in the first round.

He next competed on India's Super Fight League's third event, SFL 3, against former WEC Light Heavyweight Champion Doug Marshall.  He won the fight via KO early into the first round due to a flying knee.

Galešić moved to Light Heavyweight in order to compete in the Bellator 2012 Heavyweight Tournament. He was beaten by Attila Vegh at Bellator 71 in the quarter finals via a submission in the first round.

He fought Linton Vassell for UCMMA Light Heavyweight Championship on 2 February 2013. Zelg opened the fight with few punches and kicks and proved that he is still great puncher but Vassell moved the fight on the ground and won the fight by 1st round TKO.

Kickboxing career
Zelg made his kickboxing debout against #12 Glory ranked fighter Makoto Uehara at the R.I.S.E. 100 event on 12 June 2014. He dropped Uehara early in round one with punches and knees but rushed it and lost by KO at 1:25 of the first round.

Championships and accomplishments
Cage Rage
Cage Rage British Middleweight Championship (1 Time)
DREAM
2008 DREAM Middleweight Grand Prix Semifinalist

Kickboxing record

|-  
|-  bgcolor="#FFBBBB"
| 2014-07-12 || Loss ||align=left| Makoto Uehara || RISE 100  || Tokyo, Japan || KO (Right Hook) || 1 || 1:25 || 0–1  
|-  
! style=background:white colspan=9 |   
|- 
|-
| colspan=9 | Legend:

Mixed martial arts record

|-
| Loss
| align=center| 11–9
| Ricco Rodriguez
| Submission (armbar)
| Final Fight Championship 8
| 
| align=center| 1
| align=center| 2:10
| Zagreb, Croatia
|Catchweight 95 kg.
|-
| Loss
| align=center| 11–8
| Linton Vassell
| TKO (punches)
| UCMMA 32
| 
| align=center| 1
| align=center| 4:31
| London, England
|For UCMMA Light Heavyweight Championship.
|-
| Loss
| align=center| 11–7
| Attila Vegh
| Submission (rear-naked choke)
| Bellator 71
| 
| align=center| 1
| align=center| 1:00
| Chester, West Virginia, United States
|Light Heavyweight debut; Bellator 2012 Light Heavyweight Tournament Quarterfinal.
|-
| Win
| align=center| 11–6
| Doug Marshall
| KO (flying knee)
| SFL 3
| 
| align=center| 1
| align=center| 0:34
| New Delhi, Delhi, India
| 
|-
| Loss
| align=center| 10–6
| Alexander Shlemenko
| Submission (standing guillotine choke)
| Bellator 50
| 
| align=center| 1
| align=center| 1:55
| Hollywood, Florida, United States
|Bellator 2011 Middleweight Tournament Quarterfinal.
|-
|  Win
| align=center| 10–5
| Lee Chadwick
| KO (punch)
| OMMAC 9: Enemies
| 
| align=center| 1
| align=center| 2:40
| Liverpool, England
| 
|-
| Loss
| align=center| 9–5
| Kazushi Sakuraba
| Submission (kneebar)
| DREAM 12
| 
| align=center| 1
| align=center| 1:40
| Osaka, Japan
| 
|-
| Loss
| align=center| 9–4
| Ronaldo Souza
| Submission (armbar)
| DREAM 6: Middleweight Grand Prix 2008 Final Round
| 
| align=center| 1
| align=center| 1:27
| Saitama, Saitama, Japan
|DREAM Middleweight Grand Prix Semifinal.
|-
| Win
| align=center| 9–3
| Taiei Kin
| TKO (elbow injury)
| DREAM 4: Middleweight Grand Prix 2008 Second Round
| 
| align=center| 1
| align=center| 1:05
| Yokohama, Japan
|DREAM Middleweight Grand Prix Quarterfinal.
|-
| Win
| align=center| 8–3
| Magomed Sultanakhmedov
| Submission (armbar)
| DREAM 2: Middleweight Grand Prix 2008 First Round
| 
| align=center| 1
| align=center| 1:40
| Saitama, Saitama, Japan
|DREAM Middleweight Grand Prix Opening Round.
|-
| Win
| align=center| 7–3
| Taiei Kin
| TKO (doctor stoppage)
| HERO'S 2007 in Korea
| 
| align=center| 1
| align=center| 0:36
| Seoul, South Korea
|Catchweight 95 kg.
|-
| Loss
| align=center| 6–3
| Yoon Dong-sik
| Submission (armbar)
| Hero's 10
| 
| align=center| 1
| align=center| 1:29
| Yokohama, Japan
| 
|-
| Loss
| align=center| 6–2
| Makoto Takimoto
| Submission (kimura)
| PRIDE 34
| 
| align=center| 1
| align=center| 5:40
| Saitama, Saitama, Japan
| 
|-
| Win
| align=center| 6–1
| Mark Weir
| KO (punches)
| Cage Rage 19
| 
| align=center| 1
| align=center| 0:50
| London, England
|Won Cage Rage British Middleweight Championship.
|-
| Win
| align=center| 5–1
| James Evans-Nicolle
| TKO (stomp and punches)
| Cage Rage 18
| 
| align=center| 1
| align=center| 2:02
| London, England
| 
|-
| Win
| align=center| 4–1
| Curtis Stout
| Submission (armbar)
| Cage Rage 17
| 
| align=center| 1
| align=center| 1:10
| London, England
| 
|-
| Win
| align=center| 3–1
| Michael Holmes
| TKO (punches)
| Cage Rage 15
| 
| align=center| 1
| align=center| 1:41
| London, England
| 
|-
| Win
| align=center| 2–1
| John Flemming
| KO (punches)
| Urban Destruction 2
| 
| align=center| 1
| align=center| N/A
| Bristol, England
| 
|-
| Loss
| align=center| 1–1
| Paul Taylor
| TKO (punches)
| Urban Destruction 1
| 
| align=center| 3
| align=center| 1:42
| Bristol, England
| 
|-
| Win
| align=center| 1–0
| Jim Bentley
| KO (punch)
| UC 11: Wrath of the Beast
| 
| align=center| 1
| align=center| 1:16
| Bristol, England
|

References

External links

1979 births
Living people
Croatian male mixed martial artists
Middleweight mixed martial artists
Mixed martial artists utilizing taekwondo
Croatian male taekwondo practitioners
Sportspeople from Pula
21st-century Croatian people